Secretogranin-1, also known as Chromogranin B, is a protein that in humans is encoded by the CHGB gene. It is a member of the granin protein family.

References